Paterson River, a perennial river that is part of the Hunter River catchment, is located in the Hunter and Mid North Coast regions of New South Wales, Australia.

Course and features
Paterson River rises in the Barrington Tops National Park, west by north of Careys Peak, and flows generally south and southeast, joined by six minor tributaries including the Allyn River at Vacy, before reaching its confluence with the Hunter River between Hinton and Morpeth. Between Hinton and Duns Creek, the Paterson River forms the border between the Port Stephens and Maitland local government areas. The river system courses through fertile the farming land of the Paterson and Allyn River Valleys and the historic Patersons Plains; descending  over its  course.

The embankment dam was constructed by the New South Wales Department of Water Resources to supply water for irrigation and was completed in 1971. The river is tidal to above the village of Paterson and below Vacy.

Riverside towns within the Paterson's catchment include Gresford, Vacy, Paterson, Woodville and Hinton.

Colonel William Paterson surveyed the area along the river in 1801. Later Governor King named it in his honour.

References

External links
 

 

Port Stephens Council
Maitland, New South Wales
Dungog Shire
Hunter River (New South Wales)